Lawrence "Larry" Reynolds Pugh (January 22, 1933 – December 3, 2015) was an American businessman, who became chief executive officer of the VF Corporation, and former director at Unum and Black & Decker.  In his retirement, he served on boards at Colby College, the Harold Alfond Foundation, and the Portland Museum of Art, and the U.S. Biathlon Association.

He died on December 3, 2015 at the age of 82 in Naples, Florida.

References

2015 deaths
American business executives
Colby College alumni
1933 births